Eniro AB  is a Nordic tech company that helps small and medium-sized companies with digital marketing. Eniro also has a search service that aggregates, filters and presents information to help individuals find and come into contact with each other and with companies. The company has about 1,100 employees and operates in Sweden, Norway, Denmark and Finland through the local domains eniro.se, gulesider.no, krak.dk and degulesider.dk, and each week, Eniro Group’s digital services have about 5.2 million unique visitors. Eniro is listed on Nasdaq Stockholm [ENRO] and its head office is located in Stockholm.

Eniro is Esperanto and means access.

See also

Eniro.se
Krak.dk
Gulesider.no
Degulesider.dk

External links

Telecommunications companies of Sweden
Companies based in Solna Municipality